The 2001–02 Copa del Rey was the 100th staging of the Copa del Rey.

The competition started on 6 September 2001 and concluded on 6 March 2002 with the final, held at the Santiago Bernabéu Stadium in Madrid, in which Deportivo de La Coruña lifted the trophy with a 2–1 victory over Real Madrid.

Preliminary round

|}

Round of 64 

|}

Round of 32 

|}

Round of 16 

|}

First leg

Second leg

Quarter-finals 

|}

First leg

Second leg

Semi-finals 

|}

First leg

Second leg

Final

Top goalscorers

References

External links 

  RSSSF
  Linguasport

Copa del Rey seasons
1